The Sheila Essey Award for ALS Research was established in 1996 and is sponsored by the American Academy of Neurology. The prize is funded through the philanthropy of the Essey family and the ALS Association. The award recognizes an individual who has made seminal research contributions in the search for the cause, prevention of, and cure for amyotrophic lateral sclerosis.

The award includes a trophy, a $50,000 prize, and a 20-minute lecture at the American Academy of Neurology annual meeting. The prize is named after Sheila Essey (wife of Richard Essey) who was diagnosed with amyotrophic lateral sclerosis in 1994.

Awardees 
Source: American Academy of Neurology

 1996 Robert H. Brown Jr.
 1996 Teepue Siddique
 1997 Jeffrey Rothstein
 1998 Theodore Munsat
 1998 Lewis P. Rowland
 1999 Don Cleveland
 2000 Jean Pierre Julien
 2001 Pamela Shaw
 2002 Serge Przedborski
 2003 Stanley Appel
 2004 Peter Nigel Leigh
 2005 Michael Strong
 2006 Peter Carmeliet
 2007 Christopher Henderson
 2008 Wim Robberecht
 2009 Merit Cudkowicz
 2009 Orla Hardiman
 2010 Clive Svendsen, PhD
 2011 Leonard van den Berg
 2012 Christopher Shaw, MD, FRACP
 2013 Rosa Rademakers
 2013 Bryan J. Traynor
 2014 Jeremy Shefner
 2015 Robert Bowser, PhD
 2015 Adriano Chiò
 2016 Ammar Al-Chalabi
 2017 John M. Ravits
2018 Timothy Miller
 2019 Aaron Gitler

See also

 List of medicine awards

References 

Awards established in 1996
Medicine awards
American awards
Neuroscience awards